The Battle of Siikajoki was fought between Swedish and Russian troops on 18 April 1808 at Siikajoki, approximately 60 km south of Oulu, Finland. During the first stage of the Finnish War, the Swedish commander Wilhelm Mauritz Klingspor had decided to retreat from southern Finland, so that the Swedes would gain time, and more troops could be moved to Finland via Tornio. The retreat was also made in an effort to delay battles until the seas thawed, and to reserve troops in case the Danes took the opportunity to attack Sweden.

The Battle of Pyhäjoki, which had been fought two days earlier, was one of the first skirmishes of the war, but Siikajoki was the first major attempt to stop the advancing Russians. Carl Johan Adlercreutz had been appointed commander after Count Gustaf Löwenhielm had been captured by the Russian at Pyhäjoki. The force commanded by Georg Carl von Döbeln was trying to cross the Siikajoki River when the Russians caught up with his force. Von Döbeln decided to take a stance on the south bank of the river. He first ordered a counterattack, but was forced to pull back. At that point the Russian center opened up and the newly appointed General-Adjutant Adlercreutz ordered another attack, which threw the Russians back and halted their advance.

The Battle of Siikajoki is described in the poem "Adlercreutz" in Runeberg's epic Tales of Ensign Stål.

The Nyland Regiment distinguished themselves at the battle, and today the Siikajoki Cross can be worn by soldiers of the Nyland Brigade, which is the traditional heir, though now part of the Finnish Navy.

Swedish regiments

1st Brigade 
Åbo Infantry Regiment (3 battalions)
Nyland Infantry Regiment (1 battalion)
Nyland Jägers (1 company)
Nyland Dragoon Regiment (2 squadrons)
Finnish Artillery Regiment

2nd Brigade 
Björneborg Infantry Regiment (3 battalions)
Österbotten Infantry Regiment (1 battalion and 1 company)
Nyland Dragoon Regiment (2 squadrons)
Finnish Artillery Regiment

3rd Brigade 
Tavastehus Infantry Regiment (3 battalions)
Nyland Infantry Regiment (1 battalion)
Nyland Dragoon Regiment (3 squadrons)
Finnish Artillery Regiment

Citations and sources

Citations

Sources

External links 

Siikajoki
Siikajoki 1808
Siikajoki
1808 in Finland
Siikajoki
Siikajoki
April 1808 events
History of North Ostrobothnia